Saratoga Springs (formerly, Bachelor  Springs and Pierson Springs) is a set of springs that was turned into a resort in the 1870s in Lake County, California.
At its peak the resort could accommodate 250 people.
The resort was closed after the main hotel burned down, but reopened as a retreat in 1991.

Location

It is at an elevation of 1427 feet (435 m).

The springs are on the side of a wide, brushy drainage ravine.
The springs are in the Scotts Creek watershed.

Springs

Six of these rose in cemented basins in the Roundhouse, a circular building  in diameter.
They are all carbonated and deposit small amounts of calcium and iron, and have names like Appetizer and Digester.
There were four other springs rising in cemented basins near the Roundhouse.
Their water was collected in a tank and used for bathing.
The twelfth spring seeped from massive sandstone  up the ravine from the hotel.

A 1914 report said the main springs and their temperatures are: Magnesia 1, ; Magnesia 2, ; Arsenic, ; Sulphur, ; Soda, ; Iron,  and Seltzer, .
The water was not bottled for sale.

History

Before the resort was founded the springs were frequented by the Pomo, who used the valley for healing and peacemaking.

The first owner of what became the resort was J.W. Pearson, who found the springs in a wooded valley of the foothills in 1871.
In 1878 Pearson sold the property, then known as Pierson Springs, to J.J. Kerbert.
The U.S. government finally issued a patent for the land in 1879.
Soon after John Marhten acquired the property, which he ran until he died in 1913.
Marhten made many improvements including a new hotel, annexes and more cottages.
By 1891 the resort could accommodate 350 people, with a barn for 40 horses.

At its peak the resort covered  and had a stagecoach stop, post office, restaurant and dance hall.
It offered multiple cold mineral springs for bathing and a bottling plant for drinking.  
Guests from the San Francisco Bay Area would reach the resort by taking a train to Cloverdale, then a stagecoach via Ukiah.
In 1910 there were accommodations for 250 people in the hotel, annex and 16 cottages set in an oak grove in a small flat area beside the creek.

The post office at the springs was called Bachelor.
The Bachelor post office opened in 1882, moved to the new site in 1883, closed in 1919, reopened in 1920, and closed for good in 1940.

The owner in 1915 was John Martens Estate.
In 1920 E.R. Keil and his wife bought the resort.
A 1922 guide to California resorts said Saratoga Springs could be reached by Northwestern Pacific Railroad to Ukiah, and from there  by stagecoach.
The large, level grounds were all shaded by oak and walnut trees.
Cold and carbonated mineral waters had laxative, appetizer or digestive properties.
There was a  concrete plunge with carbonated and very invigorating water.
The resort had electric lights throughout, telephone, post office and store.
Hotels rates were $19 to $22 per week, while housekeeping cabins were $10 to $15 per week.

In 1948–1949 the Kiel's heirs sold it to Matt and Leda Callan.
Guests in the 1950s would often stay several weeks, enjoying the good cooking, swimming pool, croquet, tennis, horseback riding, dancing and other activities.
When the main hotel burned down, the Callans sold the resort.
In 1991 David Caroll bought the property and restored it as a retreat.

References

Sources 

 

Unincorporated communities in California
Unincorporated communities in Lake County, California
Resorts in Lake County, California
Springs of Lake County, California